David Cazès (born 1851, Tétouan, Morocco, died 1913) was a Moroccan Jewish educator and writer.

Early life
Sent to Paris in his early youth, he was educated by the Alliance Israélite Universelle, and at the age of eighteen was commissioned to establish and direct several primary schools in the East; namely, at Volos in Thessaly (1869), at Smyrna (1873), and at Tunis (Feb. 1878-1893). In each of these places he took part also in the organization of the Jewish communities. At Tunis especially the official organization of Judaism by the government of the French protectorate was his work. There he was founder and principal of several elementary schools.

In 1893 he moved to Buenos Aires, Argentina, serving as a member of the administrative committee of the colonization fund founded by Baron Maurice de Hirsch under the name of the Jewish Colonization Association.

Career
In 1878 Cazès was appointed an officer of the Order of Nichan Iftikhar of Tunis. The French government in 1886 awarded him academic laurels, and in 1889 the rosette of Chevalier of the Legion of Honour.

Cazès was the author of the following works: Essai sur l'Histoire des Israélites de Tunisie, Paris, 1889; and Notes Bibliographiques sur la Littérature Juives-Tunisienne, Tunis, 1893, giving an exact picture of the literary life of the Jews of Tunis. He also contributed a large number of articles to the Revue des Etudes Juives and other Jewish periodicals.

Bibliography
Joseph Tolédano, La Saga des Familles les Juifs du Maroc et Leurs Noms, 1983

External links
 
Some biographical information

19th-century Moroccan Jews
Tunisian Jews
Argentine people of Moroccan-Jewish descent
Jewish Argentine writers
People from Tétouan
1851 births
1913 deaths
Moroccan emigrants to Tunisia
Moroccan emigrants to Argentina
Moroccan male writers